Rishard Andre Matthews (born October 12, 1989) is a former American football wide receiver. He played college football for the University of Nevada, and was drafted by the Miami Dolphins in the seventh round of the 2012 NFL Draft. He also played for the Tennessee Titans and New York Jets.

Early life
Matthews was born on October 12, 1989 in Santa Ana, California. He attended Saddleback High School and lettered for the basketball team, averaging 9.8 points, 6.8 rebounds, 2.6 assists, 0.3 blocks and 2.3 steals. In addition, he played for the football team.

College career
Matthews initially signed a letter of intent committing to the University of Oregon. Matthews attended Bakersfield College before transferring to the University of Nevada, Reno. In his two years at Nevada, the first catching passes from Colin Kaepernick, he had 147 receptions for 2,243 yards and 13 touchdowns. While at Nevada, Matthews was named second-team all-WAC as a wide receiver.

Professional career
Matthews was drafted by the Miami Dolphins in the seventh round with the 227th overall selection of the 2012 NFL Draft.

Miami Dolphins

2012 season: Rookie year 
Matthews recorded his first reception in a 19–14 losing effort against the Buffalo Bills on November 15. He finished the Thursday Night Football game with one catch for 19 yards. Overall, he finished his rookie season with 11 receptions for 151 receiving yards.

2013 season 
Matthews was one of only four receivers to make the final 53-man roster in 2013. This was crucial after seeing Dustin Keller go down in a preseason game against the Houston Texans. Matthews was a second-year player adding to the likes of Mike Wallace, Brian Hartline, and Brandon Gibson. Matthews had his first two-touchdown game in another losing effort against the Tampa Bay Buccaneers on November 11, 2013. He finished the Monday Night Football game with 120 yards on 11 receptions. After Miami's Brandon Gibson went down in Week 11, Matthews has received a large increase in targets and a number of starts. Matthews proved to be a reliable target, specifically in the Miami win against the New England Patriots on December 15, 2013. Matthews caught a 24-yard reception to keep the drive alive in the 24–20 upset. The 2013 season came to an end with Matthews contributing 41 receptions for 448 yards and 2 touchdowns.

2014 season 
The 2014 campaign was a lackluster performance for Matthews, who had emerged in 2013 as a reliable target, with the season ending prematurely for Matthews when off-field conduct resulted in his suspension for the final game against the New York Jets. While Matthews had shown promise, he finished the 2014 season with 12 catches on 21 targets for 135 yards and 2 touchdowns.

2015 season 
In Week 7, against the Houston Texans, Matthews reeled in a then career-high 53-yard receiving touchdown in the first quarter of the 44–26 victory. On November 30, 2015, Matthews suffered multiple fractured ribs in the Miami Dolphins' Week 12 loss to the New York Jets. On January 2, 2016, Matthews was placed on injured reserve. Overall, in the 2015 season, he finished with 43 receptions for 662 receiving yards and four receiving touchdowns.

Tennessee Titans

2016 season
On March 9, 2016, Matthews signed a three-year deal with the Tennessee Titans. In his first season with the Titans, he set a career-high in receiving yards with 945 and with 9 receiving touchdowns. He led the Titans in both receiving yards and touchdowns.

2017 season
On September 24, 2017, Matthews scored a 55-yard touchdown during the Titans' 33–27 victory against the Seattle Seahawks. On November 16, 2017, he scored a 75-yard touchdown as the Titans lost to the Pittsburgh Steelers by a score of 40–17. Overall, he finished the 2017 season with 53 receptions for 795 receiving yards and four receiving touchdowns.

2018 season
On August 21, 2018, Matthews signed a one-year contract extension with the Titans through the 2019 season. On September 26, Matthews requested his release from the Titans, citing a lack of playing time and targets. The team granted his request the next day and released him. Matthews finished with his time with the Titans with a total of 121 receptions, 1,751 receiving yards, and 13 receiving touchdowns.

New York Jets
On October 23, 2018, Matthews signed with the New York Jets. He played in five games recording just two catches for 13 yards before being placed on injured reserve on December 18, 2018.

New Orleans Saints
On June 13, 2019, Matthews signed with the New Orleans Saints. He was released on August 10, 2019 after leaving camp.

Retirement
On August 12, 2019, Matthews announced his retirement from the NFL.

NFL career statistics

Regular season

Postseason

Personal life
Matthews's father, Andre Matthews, and half-brother, Christopher Ruiz, served in the Marines. Ruiz was killed in a plane crash in 2015 while working as a private defense contractor in Afghanistan.

References

External links
 

1989 births
Living people
Players of American football from San Diego
African-American players of American football
American football wide receivers
Bakersfield Renegades football players
Nevada Wolf Pack football players
Miami Dolphins players
Tennessee Titans players
New York Jets players
New Orleans Saints players
21st-century African-American sportspeople
20th-century African-American people